Thelma Coyne and Nancye Wynne defeated May Blick and Kath Woodward 6–2, 6–4 in the final, to win the women's doubles tennis title at the 1936 Australian Championships.

This was their first of the all-time record ten Australian Women's Doubles titles as a pair. This win also marked the start of their pre-Open Era record five consecutive Australian Women's Doubles titles streak.

Seeds

  Joan Hartigan /  Nell Hopman (semifinals)
  Thelma Coyne /  Nancye Wynne (champions)
  May Blick /  Kath Woodward (final)
  Joan Walters /  Dorothy Weston (quarterfinals)

Draw

Draw

Notes

References

External links
 Source for seedings and the draw

1936 in Australian tennis
1936 in women's tennis
1936 in Australian women's sport
Women's Doubles